Race for the Pennant is a weekly sports show focused on Major League Baseball; it premiered on Home Box Office (HBO) in 1978. It is hosted by Len Berman, Tim McCarver, Barry Tompkins, Bob Gibson, Maury Wills and others. The series ended in 1992.

See also
List of programs broadcast by HBO

References

External links
 

1978 American television series debuts
1992 American television series endings
1970s American television series
1980s American television series
1990s American television series
HBO original programming
Major League Baseball on television
HBO Sports
HBO Shows (series) WITHOUT Episode info, list, or Article